Hyper is a 2018 Indian Kannada romantic comedy-action film directed by Ganesh Vinayak and produced under the MBigPictures banner. The film features Arjun Aarya and Sheela Kaur in the lead roles, along with Rangayana Raghu, Achuthakumar, Bullet Prakash, Shobhraj, Bank Janardhan and Srinivas Prabhu. The movie released on 29 June 2018.

Plot

Surya is an agriculture student, who wants to protect vanishing greenery in Bengaluru by planting saplings and fighting against tree felling. He evens runs a nursery farm in his free time. He falls in love with Swapna, who studies in the same college. Swapna's friend Naveen is also interested in her and causes trouble for the couple. What follows is a breakup, a hospital stay and police being on the lookout for serial killers in Madikeri.

Surya desperately tries to reconcile with Swapna and the couple rekindle their romance. Slighted by her rejection, Naveen hires a killer to kill Swapna. Unaware of the dangers that await them, Surya and Swapna travel to Madikeri to attend a friend's wedding. Will they escape from the clutches of serial killers and return safely from Madikeri to lead a happy life together?

Cast

 Arjun Aarya as Surya / Suri
 Sheela Kaur as Bhanumathi
 Rangayana Raghu
 Achyuth Kumar
 Bullet Prakash
 Shobhraj 
 Bank Janardhan
 Srinivas Prabhu

Soundtrack
Since this film was directed by the director who made Veera Sivaji, Imman reused tunes from that film.

Release

The Movie released on 7 September 2018.

Critical Reception 

The Times of India rated the movie 1.5/5 and stated "Hyper lacks the ingredients required to be a breezy love story. The story line is not strong enough to keep one glued to the screen. Director Ganesh Vinayak's attempt to make a cute love story in the backdrop of serial killings turns out to be a disaster. Arjun Aarya looks good in patches. Sheila makes a comeback to Sandalwood after a long hiatus — she makes an impression as a college-going girl. Actors Rangayana Raghu and Achyuth Kumar have done their best. The songs are average. Watch this film only if you fancy predictable college love sagas."

References

External links
  Hyper Gallery
 MBigPicture Facebook Page
 

2018 films
Indian romantic comedy films
Films scored by D. Imman
2010s Kannada-language films
2018 romantic comedy films
2018 action comedy films
Indian action comedy films